Tommy Kiviaho (born 27 June 1971) is a Finnish former professional ice hockey player. He played with numerous clubs during his career, HC Slovan Bratislava in the Slovak Extraliga was one of them.

Career statistics

Regular season and playoffs

International

References

External links

1978 births
Living people
Ässät players
Augsburger Panther players
EHC Lustenau players
Espoo Blues players
Frisk Asker Ishockey players
HC Litvínov players
HC Slovan Bratislava players
HIFK (ice hockey) players
Ilves players
Lillehammer IK players
Modo Hockey players
Lahti Pelicans players
Stjernen Hockey players
Vålerenga Ishockey players
Finnish expatriate ice hockey players in Austria
Finnish expatriate ice hockey players in the Czech Republic
Finnish expatriate ice hockey players in Germany
Finnish expatriate ice hockey players in Sweden
Finnish expatriate ice hockey players in Norway
Finnish ice hockey left wingers
Ice hockey people from Helsinki